In Bangladesh, Valentine's Day has been popular since 1980s, despite of being celebrated since 498 AD all over the world. On the day, especially youngs, people exchange various greeting cards, flowers, chocolates or gifts. However, despite being much widespread, country’s conservative society view the celebration of the day as an un-Islamic value and a heretic culture, and thus discourage the celebration by the young boys and girls.

Once the country celebrated "anti-authoritarian day" popularly on the same date, before the Valentine's Day spread among the people.

History
In 1993, Valentine's Day was individually celebrated by Shafik Rehman, a journalist and editor of Jaijaidin, in Bangladesh. While studying in London, he was acquainted with the western culture. He highlighted the Valentine's Day to the Bangladeshis through his newspaper, Jaijaidin. It is learned that when someone went to his newspaper office in Tejgaon for a job, he had to take his girlfriend with him. Shafik Rehman was the first to use the title "Valentine's Day", for this he is called the "Father of Valentine's Day in Bangladesh". He also named "Love lane", the street in front of his office.

Those Bangladeshis who were more cosmopolitan embraced the global Valentine's Day observance, while those who were more conservative rejected the imported western celebration as un-Islamic, in particular because of its emphasis on romance between unmarried boys and girls. As recently as 2008, tensions between the two sides were high enough that many university students were afraid to celebrate the day on campus.

More recently, western popular culture and global consumer culture have shifted Bangladeshi attitudes towards acceptance of Valentine's Day. By 2018, it became common in Bangladesh for romance films to premiere on Valentine's Day and for businesses to offer special deals to couples on 14 February.

Celebrations
This day is mainly celebrated in the urban areas of the country. Historically, the day had no effect in the villages but in recent times, the day has partially influenced the village society also. No public holiday is declared on this day in Bangladesh.

On the day, people in various bonds, including mainly lovers, friends, husbands and wives, and also parents and children, students and teachers express their love for each other with flowers, chocolates, cards and other gifts. On this day, various parks and recreation centers of the country are full of people, of love.

Bangladesh, however, is quite liberal and open about the celebration of Valentine's Day in comparing with neighboring India and Pakistan, whereas institutional attitudes towards Valentine's Day in these countries are more conservative.

References

Valentine's Day
Controversies in Bangladesh